Relations between the European Union and the United States began in 1953, when US diplomats visited the European Coal and Steel Community (the EU precursor, created in 1951) in addition to the national governments of its six founding countries (Belgium, France, Italy, Luxembourg, the Netherlands, and West Germany). The two parties share a good relationship which is strengthened by NATO (a military alliance), cooperation on trade, and shared values.

History

Establishing Diplomatic Relations

Diplomatic relations between the U.S. and the European Community were initiated in 1953 when the first U.S. observers were sent to the European Coal and Steel Community. The U.S. Mission to the ECSC formally opened in Luxembourg in 1956. The Delegation of the European Commission to the United States in Washington, D.C. was established in 1954, and the United States Mission to the European Communities, now the United States Mission to the European Union, was established in 1961 in Brussels. In Brussels on November 25, 2003, and on May 6, 2004, in Washington, D.C., the U.S. and the EU celebrated 50 years of diplomatic ties.

Formalized Cooperation

In 1990, the relations of the U.S. with the European Community were formalized by the adoption of the Transatlantic Declaration. A regular political dialogue between the U.S. and the EC was thereby initiated at various levels, including regular summit meetings. The cooperation focused on the areas of economy, education, science and culture.

The New Transatlantic Agenda (NTA), which was launched at the Madrid summit in 1995, carried the cooperation forward. The NTA contains four broad objectives for U.S.-EU collaboration: promoting peace and stability, democracy and development around the world; responding to global challenges; contributing to the expansion of world trade and closer economic relations; and building bridges Across the Atlantic.

In connection with the adoption of the New Transatlantic Agenda a Joint EU-U.S. Action Plan was drawn up committing the EU and the U.S. to a large number of measures within the overall areas of cooperation. As an extension of the NTA efforts, agreement was reached at the 1998 London summit to intensify cooperation in the area of trade, which resulted in the Transatlantic Economic Partnership (TEP). The TEP covers both bilateral and multilateral trade. Bilaterally, TEP addresses various types of obstacles to trade and strives to establish agreements on mutual recognition in the areas of goods and services. Furthermore, there is cooperation in the areas of public procurement and intellectual property law. Multilaterally, focus is on further liberalization of trade within the World Trade Organization in order to strengthen world trade. The interests of the business sector, the environment and the consumers are to be integrated into this work.

In building bridges across the Atlantic, a number of people-to-people dialogues have been set up. The goal is to enable individual actors to give their opinion. In connection with each summit meeting time is set aside for meetings with representatives of one or more of these dialogues, which include the Transatlantic Business Dialogue (TABD); the Transatlantic Consumer Dialogue (TACD); the Transatlantic Policy Network (TPN), a non-governmental grouping of members of the U.S. Congress and the European Parliament, business leaders and think tanks; the Transatlantic Environmental Dialogue (TAED); and the Transatlantic Legislators Dialogue (TLD).

Together the US and EU dominate global trade, they play the leading roles in international diplomacy and military strength. What each one says matters a great deal to much of the rest of the world. Both the US and the majority of EU member states are members of the North Atlantic Treaty Organization (NATO). And yet they have regularly disagreed with each other on a wide range of specific issues, as well as having often quite different political, economic, and social agendas. Since the EU does not have a fully integrated foreign policy, relations can be more complicated when the member states do not have a common agreed position, as EU foreign policy was divided during the Iraq War. Understanding the relationship today means reviewing developments that predate the creation of the European Economic Community (precursor to today's European Union).

The European experience with the Trump administration (2017–21) left uncertainty vis-à-vis a realistic prospect on long-term predictability of US foreign policy. The period saw a deepening of contradictions between both parties, including trade, climate action and adherence to international treaties.

On December 2, 2020, following the 2020 US presidential election, a joint communication published by the European Commission lined up a proposal for a new agenda of improvement of the EU–US relations with the incoming Biden administration, seeking for partnership in four major policy areas: health response, climate change, trade and tech, and security.

On March 5, 2021, following a call between EU Commission president Ursula von der Leyen and US president Joe Biden, the EU and the US agreed to suspend all the retaliatory tariffs linked to the Airbus and Boeing disputes for a 4-month period.

On September 20, 2021, EU Commission President Ursula Von der Leyen called "not acceptable" the treatment of one of EU's member states (France) over the AUKUS submarine deal, when Australia, the United States and the UK negotiated a defence pact ditching a long-standing Australian agreement with France. Similarly, European Council president Charles Michel denounced a "lack of loyalty" on the part of the US.

The EU–US Trade and Technology Council (TTC) met for the first time on September 29, 2021, in Pittsburgh.

Comparison

Trade 

Euro-American relations are primarily concerned with trade policy. The EU is a near-fully unified trade bloc and this, together with competition policy, are the primary matters of substance currently between the EU and the US. The two together represent 60% of global GDP, 33% of world trade in goods and 42% of world trade in services. The growth of the EU's economic power has led to a number of trade conflicts between the two powers; although both are dependent upon the other's economic market and disputes affect only 2% of trade. See below for details of trade flows.

In 2007, a Transatlantic Economic Council was established to direct economic cooperation between the two. It is headed by the US. Deputy National Security Advisor for International Economic Affairs and the EU's Commissioner for Trade. However, it is yet to produce solid results. A Transatlantic Free Trade Area had been proposed in the 1990s and later in 2006 by German Chancellor Angela Merkel in reaction to the collapse of the Doha round of trade talks. However, protectionism on both sides may be a barrier to any future agreement. Recent developments have seen the proposal of a new agreement called the Transatlantic Trade and Investment Partnership (TTIP) between the US and the EU. This agreement has the aim of fostering economic growth through bilateral trade and investments. In August 2019, Trump announced an accord to increase beef exports to the European Union. The US Trade Representative Robert Lighthizer signed agreement with Jani Raappana, representing EU Presidency, and Ambassador Stavros Lambrinidis of the EU delegation.

EU is one of the main trade partners of the US:
In 2016, European-Union (28) is 18.7% of US merchandise exports, and 18.9% of US merchandise imports.
In 2016, European-Union (28) is 30.9% of US commercial services exports, and 35.3% of US commercial services imports

The US is one of the main trade partner of the EU:
In 2016, the US is 20.1% of European-Union (28)  merchandise exports, and 14.2% of European-Union (28) merchandise imports.
In 2016, the US is 27.2% of European-Union (28) commercial services exports, and 30.5% of European-Union (28) commercial services imports

In August 2020, the EU and US agreed, for the first time in two decades, to reduce certain tariffs (on a most favoured nation basis, meaning the tariffs are dropped for all trading partners).

Cooperation

Energy and sustainability 
The US and EU cooperate on the topic of energy and sustainability. The general aim of both parties is to liberalize and enhance sustainability in the global energy markets. This cooperation officially started in 2009 when the EU-US Energy Council was founded. This institution regularly meets and addresses topics such as: energy security challenges, climate change, renewable energy, nuclear safety and research.

In February 2021, President of the European Commission Ursula von der Leyen stated that the European Union and United States should join forces in combatting climate change and agreeing on a new framework for the digital market to limit the power of large tech companies. Both the EU and US have set goals by 2050 to cut its net greenhouse gas emissions and to become a 'net zero economy' respectively.

Defense contracts 
In March 2010 EADS and its US partner pulled out of a contract to build air refueling planes worth $35 billion. They had previously won the bid but it was rerun and EADS claimed the new process was biased towards Boeing. The European Commission said it would be "highly regrettable" if the tendering process did prove to be biased. There was substantial opposition to EADS in Washington due to the ongoing Boeing-Airbus (owned by EADS) dispute.

Issues

EU–US summits 
Summits are held between United States and European Union policy makers. When these take place in Europe, they have historically taken place in the country that holds the rotating Presidency of the European Union.

 The United Kingdom was a member of the EU at the time the summit took place.

Boeing and Airbus subsidies 

The two companies are the major competing aircraft manufacturers, and both Boeing and Airbus are accused of receiving forms of subsidy from the United States and from some of the European Union member states respectively. Both sides have criticized each other for doing so.

In December 2020, the United States announced plans to impose additional tariffs on certain products from France and Germany, particularly aircraft parts and wines, in retaliation to tariffs imposed by the European Union.

Genetically modified food 

Genetically modified food is another significant area of disagreement between the two. The EU has been under domestic pressure to restrict the growth and import of genetically modified foods until their safety is proven to the satisfaction of the populace.

Rendition 

The Washington Post claimed on November 2, 2005, that the United States was maintaining several secret jails (or "black sites") in Eastern Europe. Poland and Romania, however, have denied these allegations. Also, Central Intelligence Agency (CIA) planes carrying terror suspects would have made secret stopovers in several West European countries since 2001. Belgium, Iceland, Spain, and Sweden have launched investigations. The Guardian calculated on November 30 that CIA planes landed about 300 times on European air ports. Most planes would have landed in Germany and the United Kingdom as a transit point to East Europe, North Africa (possibly Morocco and Egypt), or the Middle East (possibly Syria and Jordan). In the meanwhile, the European Commission, on behalf of the European Union, asked the United States for a clarification. The US has refused to confirm or deny the reports.

Extraordinary rendition flights through Europe were investigated over a number of years by the European Parliament and it held a temporary committee on the matter. The EU has also opposed the use of the Guantanamo Bay detention camp and offered to host some former inmates when its closure was announced by the administration of US President Barack Obama.

Capital punishment 

In the United States, capital punishment is a legal form of punishment, whereas all European Union member states have fully abolished it and consider its use to be a violation of fundamental human rights. This occasionally causes problems with EU-US relations, because it is illegal in the European Union to allow the extradition of a citizen to a country where the death penalty is a legal punishment, unless a guarantee is given that such punishment will not be used.

International Criminal Court 

Positions in the United States concerning the International Criminal Court vary widely. The Clinton Administration signed the Rome Statute in 2000, but did not submit it for Senate ratification. The Bush Administration, the US administration at the time of the ICC's founding, stated that it would not join the ICC. The Obama Administration has subsequently re-established a working relationship with the court.

Iraq War 

The Iraq War divided opinions within European nations and within the United States, with some states supporting of military action, and some against. The European public opinion was staunchly opposed to the war. This caused a major transatlantic rift, especially between the states led by France and Germany on the one hand, who were against military action, and the United States with United Kingdom, Italy, Spain and Poland.

Kyoto Protocol 

The European Union is one of the main backers of the Kyoto Protocol, which aims to combat global warming. The United States which initially signed the protocol at its creation during the Clinton Administration, never had the measure ratified by the United States Senate, an essential requirement to give the protocol the force of law in the United States. Later, in March 2001, under President George W. Bush, the United States removed its signature from the protocol, leading to much acrimony between the United States and European nations. In 2008, President Barack Obama said that he planned on setting annual targets to reduce emissions, although this doesn't include the Kyoto Protocol—likely because developing nations are exempt.

Visa waiver reciprocity 
The EU is requesting from the US reciprocity regarding the visa waiver program for all its members. The European Union has threatened with the possibility of imposing visas for American citizens that would extend to the entire EU, excluding France in respect of its Outermost Regions, and Ireland, which operate visa policies distinct from the Schengen acquis. In 2008, many of the EU's new Central European members were granted visa-free access to the US, and currently, three out of 27 EU members (Bulgaria, Cyprus, and Romania) lack such access.

Privacy 
In the autumn of 2015, in the wake of the Snowden revelations in Europe (see details), the dissimilar interpretations of privacy prevailing in the United States and Europe came to the surface in an upset of the International Safe Harbor Privacy Principles by a court ruling of the European Court of Justice.

Nord Stream 

In mid-June 2017, Germany and Austria issued a joint statement that said the proposed anti-Russian Countering America's Adversaries Through Sanctions Act bill heralded a "new and very negative quality in European-American relations" and that certain provisions affecting gas pipeline projects with Russia were an illegal threat to EU energy security.

On July 26, 2017, France's foreign ministry described the new U.S. sanctions as illegal under international law due to their extraterritorial reach.

At the end of July 2017, the proposed law's Russia sanctions caused harsh criticism and threats of retaliatory measures on the part of the European Union President Jean-Claude Juncker. Germany's minister for Economics and Energy Brigitte Zypries described the sanctions as illegal under international law and urged the European Union to take appropriate counter-measures.

Spying 

Secret documents obtained by German news magazine Der Spiegel in 2013 state that European Union offices in the United States and United Nations headquarters have been targeted for spying by the National Security Agency (NSA), an intelligence office operated by the United States government. The reports revealed that the United States bugged offices, accessed internal computer networks, obtained documents and emails, and listened to phone calls. Subsequent reports from the media further state that domestic European Union offices in Brussels have also been targeted; along with EU offices, embassies of India, Japan, Mexico, South Korea and Turkey are also listed as targets in the documents. On June 30, 2013, the President of the European Parliament, Martin Schulz demanded for a full clarification from Washington and stated that if the allegations were true, EU and US relations would be severely impacted.

Fall of Afghanistan
The fall of Afghanistan in August 2021 had a negative impact on United States–European Union relations.

Resolved

Banana wars 
The EU and the US have had a long-running dispute over the EU's banana imports. As part of their international aid, the EU offered tenders, on a first-come-first-served basis, for bananas from countries in Africa, the Caribbean and the Pacific. The United States argued that it favored local producers in former colonies of EU member-states over US-owned corporations in Latin America. The Clinton administration responded by imposing heavy tariffs on luxury goods created in the EU. Such goods included cashmere from Scotland and French Cognac brandy, made in the original constituency of then Prime Minister of France Jean-Pierre Raffarin. The Clinton administration then took the banana wars to the World Trade Organization (WTO) in 1999, after Chiquita made a $500,000 donation to the Democratic Party. The two sides reached an agreement in 2001.

Delegations 

Diplomatic relations are maintained between the US and the EU, as an independent body, as well as all EU member states.

The EU is represented in the US by the Delegation of the European Union to the United States in Washington, D.C. Opened in 1954, it was the first overseas delegation of the EU's forerunner, the European Coal and Steel Community (ECSC). The current EU ambassador to the United States, since 2014, is David O'Sullivan. Additionally, all 27 EU member states have an embassy in Washington, D.C.

The United States' diplomatic mission to the EU is the United States Mission to the European Union in Brussels. The current US ambassador to the EU, since 2014, is Anthony Gardner. The United States established a diplomatic mission to the ECSC in 1956 in the city of Luxembourg and, in 1961, the United States Mission to the European Communities in Brussels. The US has embassies in all 27 EU member states.

The Transatlantic Economic Council is a bilateral forum for economic cooperation between the EU and US established during the 2007 US-EU Summit. It meets at least once per year and is jointly headed by the US Deputy National Security Advisor for International Economic Affairs and the EU's Commissioner for Trade.

Diplomacy 

The US and the EU share two different approaches to diplomacy. The scholar Michael Smith defined the US as a "warrior state". This refers to its diplomatic approach based on sovereignty, state action and the use of military capabilities. On the other hand, the EU displays a diplomacy which is one of a "trading state". This means that EU diplomacy focuses on soft power, negotiation and trade. The EU diplomatic style reflects the fact that there is not a strong and cohesive foreign policy among its member states. The US and EU diplomatic features are also reflected in their relations with the United Nations. The EU relies more on the permission of the UN in order to use force abroad while the US adopts a position of opposition towards UN authorization for interference.

United States foreign relations with EU member states

  Austria
  Belgium
  Bulgaria
  Croatia
  Cyprus
  Czech Republic
  Denmark
  Estonia
  Finland
  France
  Germany
  Greece
  Hungary
  Ireland
  Italy
  Latvia
  Lithuania
  Luxembourg
  Malta
  Netherlands
  Poland
  Portugal
  Romania
  Slovakia
  Slovenia
  Spain
  Sweden

See also 

 Transatlantic relations
 European Union–NATO relations
 Transatlantic Free Trade Area
 Élysée Treaty
 NATO
 Cold War
 War on Terror

References

Further reading
 Birchfield, Vicki L., and Alasdair R. Young, eds. Triangular Diplomacy among the United States, the European Union, and the Russian Federation (Palgrave Macmillan, 2018).
 Gardner, Anthony Luzzatto. Stars with stripes: The essential partnership between the European Union and the United States (Springer Nature, 2020).
 Lundestad, Geir. The United States and Western Europe since 1945: from 'empire' by invitation to transatlantic drift (Oxford University Press, 2005).
 Lundestad, Geir, ed. Just Another Major Crisis?: The United States and Europe Since 2000 (2008)
 McCormick, John. The European superpower (Macmillan Education UK, 2017). online
 Topliceanu, Stefan Catalin. "The Economic Competition between United States, European Union and China." in Challenges of the Knowledge Society (2019): 1296–1302. online
 Winand, Pascaline. Eisenhower, Kennedy, and the United States of Europe (St Martin's Press, 1993).
 Bellocchio, Luca. L'eterna alleanza? La special relationship angloamericana tra continuità e mutamento, Franco Angeli, Milano, 2006

External links
 Book – The Obama Moment: European and American Perspectives European Union Institute for Security Studies
 Trade information between EU and US, Animated infographic, European Parliamentary Research Service
 European Union Institute for Security Studies: Research on EU-US Relations
 Delegation of the European Commission to the United States
 European Commission: relations with the United States
 FAES A case for an open Athlantic Prosperity Area
 United States Mission to the European Union
 Transatlantic Business Dialogue
 The Transatlantic Trade and Investment Partnership – Defensive Move or Constructive Engagement A Research Based Documentary placing the TTIP negotiations in a global context – Produced by the Institut d'Etudes Européennes of the Université Libre de Bruxelles

 
Third-country relations of the European Union